Enlow was an American Christian hardcore and Christian punk band, where they primarily played hardcore punk and post-hardcore. They come from Oklahoma. The band started making music in 2003 and disbanded around 2006. The band released a studio album, The Desperate Letters, in 2003, with Blood and Ink Records. Their subsequent album, The Recovery, was released by Blood and Ink Records, in 2006. They are currently slated to be headlining PromCore (May 18th) in Tulsa, OK at The Vanguard Tulsa

Background
Enlow was a Christian hardcore and Christian punk band from Tulsa, OK.

Music history
The band commenced as a musical entity in 2003, with their first release, The Desperate Letters, a studio album, that was released in 2003, from Blood and Ink Records. Their subsequent release, another studio album, The Recovery, was released by Blood and Ink Records, on January 24, 2006.

Members

Discography
Studio albums
 The Desperate Letters (2003, Blood and Ink) - Artwork by Burns Thornton
 The Recovery (January 24, 2006, Blood and Ink)

References

External links
 Blood and Ink Records

Musical groups from Oklahoma
2003 establishments in Oklahoma
2006 disestablishments in Oklahoma
Musical groups established in 2003
Musical groups disestablished in 2006
Blood and Ink Records artists